Eusebio Castigliano (9 February 1921 – 4 May 1949) was an Italian footballer who played as a midfielder.

Club career
Castigliano played professional club football for Pro Vercelli, Spezia, Biellese and Torino where he was part of the Grande Torino team, and won four consecutive league titles.

On 4 May 1949, Castigliano died in the Superga air disaster.

International career
Castigliano also earned seven caps for Italy between 1945 and 1949, scoring one goal.

Honours
Torino
Serie A (4): 1944–45, 1946–47, 1947–48, 1948–49

References

1921 births
1949 deaths
People from Vercelli
Italian footballers
Italy international footballers
Serie A players
F.C. Pro Vercelli 1892 players
Spezia Calcio players
Torino F.C. players
Association football midfielders
Footballers killed in the Superga air disaster
A.S.D. La Biellese players